"La Cinquantaine" (French "the fiftieth anniversary") is a piece of music which was composed by Jean Gabriel-Marie in 1887.

A swing arrangement of the work by James "Jiggs" Noble, recorded in New York City in late 1940 or early 1941 by Woody Herman and his orchestra as "The Golden Wedding", became a 1941 hit and a jazz standard. The record is notable for its extended (34 bars) drum solo by Frankie Carlson.

Audio recordings

Classical
1947 – John Serry Sr. with Joe Biviano's Accordion & Rhythm Sextette on the album Accordion Capers for Sonora records 
1954 – John Serry Sr. performed/arranged the composition for accordion & his ensemble for RCA Victor(See RCA Thesaurus).
Jazz
1941 – Woody Herman and his Orchestra, recorded NYC 13 February 1941. Personnel: John Owens, Steady Nelson, Cappy Lewis trumpets; Vic Hamman, Neil Reid, Bud Smith trombones; Woody Herman clarinet; Eddie Scalzi,  Herb Tomkins alto saxes; Micky Folus, Saxie Mansfield tenor saxes; Tommy Linehan piano; Hy White guitar; Walter Yoder bass; Frank Carlson drums; re-released in UK on Brunswick LAT8092 (10" LP) 1955.

References

Instrumentals
Jazz compositions
1940s jazz standards
1887 compositions